A heuhotel (German for "hay hotel") is a form of public lodging in which guests pay for sleeping accommodations in bedding made of hay, typically in shared quarters.

The style of lodging first became popular in the middle ages, and had a resurgence in modern form in Germany in 2009. As of then the typical price was 8 euros per night per guest.

References

Hotel types